Center Valley is an unincorporated community in Liberty Township, Hendricks County, Indiana.

In 1885, Center Valley contained a post office, but no surrounding settlement. The post office closed in 1902.

Geography

Notable person
 John Cravens, former Registrar of Indiana University, was born in Center Valley.

References

External links
 Cities and Villages: Center Valley, Indiana

Unincorporated communities in Hendricks County, Indiana
Unincorporated communities in Indiana
Indianapolis metropolitan area